Raju Bista (born 3 January 1986) is an Indian politician and  managing director of Surya Roshni Limited. He was elected to the Lok Sabha, lower house of the Parliament of India, from Darjeeling, West Bengal in the 2019 Indian general election as a member of the Bharatiya Janata Party. He is a National Spokesperson of the BJP. On 14 July, 2021, he has been appointed as a National General Secretary of Bharatiya Janata Yuva Morcha.

Personal life
Bista was born on 3 January 1986 in a Gorkha family of Vishnu and Prabah Bista in Charhajare, Senapati district of Manipur. He is a Bachelor of Arts and was educated at Presidency College, Motbung which is affiliated to Manipur University. Bista married Anita Bista on 6 October 2006, with whom he has two daughters. He is a businessperson by profession and is also involved with social work.

References

External links
 Official biographical sketch in Parliament of India website
Personal Website

1986 births
Living people
India MPs 2019–present
Lok Sabha members from West Bengal
Bharatiya Janata Party politicians from West Bengal
Indian Gorkhas
People from Darjeeling
People from Manipur